Farmington is an unincorporated community and census-designated place (CDP) in Davie County, North Carolina, United States, located at the intersection of NC 801 and Farmington Road (SR 1410). It was first listed as a CDP in the 2020 census with a population of 291. Located nearby is the Farmington Dragway.

Demographics

2020 census

Note: the US Census treats Hispanic/Latino as an ethnic category. This table excludes Latinos from the racial categories and assigns them to a separate category. Hispanics/Latinos can be of any race.

References

Census-designated places in Davie County, North Carolina
Census-designated places in North Carolina
Unincorporated communities in Davie County, North Carolina
Unincorporated communities in North Carolina